In Queensland, Australia, public bus services are coordinated by the Queensland Government's Department of Transport and Main Roads and provided by over 1000 operators. The coordination of public bus transport generally falls under three schemes: TransLink services, QConnect services and the remaining rural/regional school services. Some operators also provide entirely private bus services in Queensland which are not subject to the same route and ticketing regulation as the public route providers, or segments thereof, are.

History

Historically, Brisbane operated a network of trolleybuses and trams which were closed in 1969 in favour of an increased bus fleet for Brisbane.

TransLink services

TransLink, a division of the Queensland Department of Transport and Main Roads, coordinates the provision all urban and some school bus services across South East Queensland. Responsibility for the actual operation of bus services rests with 17 subcontracted bus service providers, such as Brisbane Transport, each allocated a specific contract area within the region and which operate services pursuant to TransLink's timetabling and integrated ticketing system that uses contactless smartcards known as the go card.

TransLink also oversees Queensland Rail suburban trains and Transdev Brisbane Ferries on the Brisbane River to enable an integrated public transport system for the region.

QConnect services

QConnect, stylised as qconnect, is an agency of the Department which subsidises bus, rail and air networks in regional Queensland. QConnect coordinates the urban, and some school, bus services of 17 providers in large regional towns such as Warwick or Cairns. QConnect also coordinates a range of long distance coach services between regional towns, allowing residents of rural communities to travel by bus to larger population centres to access services such as healthcare or education services. The subsidisation of regional bus fares by the state government makes it more financially affordable for residents of rural communities to travel by bus, which would otherwise be cost-prohibitive for many commuters given the extremely large distances between some Queensland towns.

Rural/regional school services
The remaining school bus runs not falling under qconnect jurisdiction in regional or rural Queensland are managed directly by the Department and delivered by over 700 local providers.

Private operators
Private bus providers such as Greyhound Australia also operate within Queensland, providing separate intra- and interstate routes and route numbering systems. This is despite attempts (at least by TransLink) to introduce a uniform route numbering system.  Whilst these private bus operators are not route-regulated or price-regulated in the same way as local government owned providers or public transport providers, the Department of Transport and Main Roads assists private bus operators to develop efficient, sustainable and flexible transport services where necessary.

Infrastructure

Busways

In Brisbane, a 25 km network of busways has been constructed to allow public transport buses to bypass traffic congestion whilst providing interconnectivity with the Queensland Rail network. Dedicated bus lanes and general high-occupancy vehicle lanes (transit lanes) can be found throughout the state, giving buses a further mechanism to bypass traffic congestion, albeit in a slower (but cheaper) way as those lanes are rarely grade separated.

Bus stops

Bus stops are designated places where buses stop for passengers to board or leave a bus. There are four bus stop types which are used throughout Queensland. The type of bus stop used depends on the number of passengers that will use the bus stop. These bus stop types include regular, intermediate, premium and signature. 'Regular' bus stops are used for low frequency bus services with low passenger volumes and are located in outer suburban or non-urban areas. 'Intermediate' bus stops are used by moderate frequency bus services with moderate passenger volumes and are located in suburban areas. 'Premium' bus stops are serviced by high frequency bus services with moderate to high passenger volumes and are located at major attractions (e.g. shopping centres). Premium bus stops may be located near bus priority measures such as bus queue jumps, bus lanes or transit lanes. 'Signature' bus stops are located on busways, interchanges and streets in Brisbane CBD. The bus stop is used by high frequency bus services with moderate to high passenger volumes. These bus stops have adequate space for indented or off-road bus bays and standing room for three or more buses.

Located on every bus stop is signage called the 'bus stop marker' which is used to indicate where the front door of the bus is located while the bus is at the stop. There are three types of signages: Regular bus stops uses the 'flag pole'; Intermediate bus stops uses the 'j-pole'; both Premium and Signature bus stops use the 'blade'.

See also

Rail transport in South East Queensland
Transport in Brisbane

References

External links

Official websites of TransLink and qconnect
Brisbane City Council - Brisbane Transport

 
Transport in Queensland